Neil McLellan is an English record producer, composer and mix engineer.

McLellan has worked with XL Recordings, Sony BMG Music Ent., Epic, Sire, Arista, Columbia, Maverick, Virgin, and Island Records to produce a string of No. 1 hits, as well as gold and platinum records. Bands and artists Neil has worked with include: The Prodigy, Erasure, Madonna, Archive, Oasis, Nine Inch Nails, Orbital, Eric Kupper, Carl Cox, Sasha, Senser, Telepopmusik, Hinda Hicks, Manu Chao, Brother Brown, Terrorvision, U.N.K.L.E., and Heartless Crew.

McLellan's most popular work began with the UK band The Prodigy, co-producing and mixing Music for the Jilted Generation, and mixing the hit singles "Firestarter" and "Breathe". In 2004, he co-produced the Prodigy album Always Outnumbered, Never Outgunned, co-writing several tracks. He was also a co-producer for their album The Day Is My Enemy.

Works

References

External links
 Neil Mclellan Music Services

Living people
English record producers
Year of birth missing (living people)